Fred Düren (1928–2015) was a German stage, film and television actor. His career was spent in East Germany, where he appeared in several DEFA films including the historical adventure Follow Me, Scoundrels (1964).  He was married to the actress Irmgard Düren. In 1988 he converted to Judaism and settled in Israel, where he died in 2015.

Filmography

References

Bibliography
 Goble, Alan. The Complete Index to Literary Sources in Film. Walter de Gruyter, 1999.

External links

1928 births
2015 deaths
German male film actors
German male stage actors
German male television actors
Male actors from Berlin
German emigrants to Israel
20th-century German Jews
Converts to Judaism from atheism or agnosticism
Israeli rabbis